Goldschmidt's tolerance factor (from the German word Toleranzfaktor) is an indicator for the stability and distortion of crystal structures. It was originally only used to describe the perovskite ABO3 structure, but now tolerance factors are also used for ilmenite.

Alternatively the tolerance factor can be used to calculate the compatibility of an ion with a crystal structure.

The first description of the tolerance factor for perovskite was made by Victor Moritz Goldschmidt in 1926.

Mathematical expression 
The Goldschmidt tolerance factor is a dimensionless number that is calculated from the ratio of the ionic radii:

In an ideal cubic perovskite structure, the lattice parameter (i.e., length) of the unit cell (a) can be calculated using the following equation:

Perovskite structure 
The perovskite structure has the following tolerance factors (t):

See also 

 Goldschmidt classification
 Victor Goldschmidt

References 
 

Crystallography
Mineralogy